Martin Lueck may refer to:

 Martin L. Lueck (1872–1926), American politician and judge
 Martin C. Lueck (1888–1986), American farmer and politician